Mitraniketan K. Viswanathan (8 February 1928 – 28 April 2014) was an Indian social reformer, philanthropist and environmentalist in Kerala, India. He founded Mitraniketan, a non governmental organization in Vellanadu, Thiruvananthapuram in 1956.

Biography
Viswanathan was born on 8 February 1928 in Vellanad, Thiruvananthapuram District, Kerala, India.

He did his schooling in Thiruvananthapuram and joined Visva-Bharati University, founded by Rabindranath Tagore and completed Siksha Bhavana in 1953. Later he continued his studies in the US, the UK and in Scandinavia. During his days in the US, he came in touch with Arthur E. Morgan which helped him shape his later years.

On his return to India, he founded Mitraniketan, The Home of Friends, in 1955, which works in the fields of innovation, training and extension in community development, environment, science, education and appropriate technology. The organisation has since grown to cover 60 acres of land housing Mitraniketan People's College, a Krishi Vigyan Kendra (KVK), a training centre for women, a fully equipped bakery, pottery centre, and a technology transfer programme.

He was the patron of Kerala Voluntary Action League (KAVAL), a network of Non Governmental organizations. Further, he chaired many organisations and attended conferences in India and abroad and served as a member of many government boards.

Viswanathan inspired many with his Gandhi-like commitment to simplicity and the poor. Daniele Giovannucci, who went on to found the Committee on Sustainability Assessment (COSA) worked there in 1990–91 with Professor Will Alexander as they explored the paradox of extraordinary levels of human development despite high levels of poverty. The Mitraniketan experience pointed Giovannucci and Alexander and the dozens of researchers they assembled there to insights about development decoupled from economics to rely on universal education and literacy, relative gender equality in a formerly matrilineal society, and collaborative use of simple yet effective technologies. This enigma emerged originally in the work of scientists Richard Franke and Barbara Chasin who began researching the region in the late 1980s (see, for example, Radical Reform As Development in an Indian State) and was highlighted in a short article by Bill McKibben.

He died on 28 April 2014 due to heart related problems at a private clinic in Thiruvananthapuram.

Awards
He was a winner of many awards and fellowships, including Platinum Jubilee Endowment Trust Award by Indian Merchants Chamber, K P Goenka Award for Environment by Asian Cables Foundation and The Jamnalal Bajaj Award for application of science and technology in rural areas. He was awarded Padmashri by Government of India in 2009.

 Padmashri by Government of India - 2009
 Sevanaratnam Award – 2002
 Best Krishi Vigyan Kendra Award - 1998-99 
 Arch Bishop Mar Gregorious Memorial Award - 1997
 M. K. K. Nair Award for Excellence in Social Work - 1997
 Chellayyan Nadar Award for Excellence in Social Work - 1996
 TRASS Award by Trivandrum Social Service Society for Excellence in Social Work - 1994
 Jamnalal Bajaj Award for application of Science and Technology in rural areas - 1992
 Ratindra Puraskar by Visva-Bharati University  for contributions to rural development through the application of Science- 1991
 K. P. Goenka Award for Environment by Asian Cables Foundation - 1987
 Platinum Jubilee Endowment Trust Award by Indian Merchants' Chamber - 1986
 Sahodaran Sevaretna Puraskar
 Henry Dunant Red Cross Award

References

External links
 Mitraniketan Web Site
 Krishi Vigyan Kendra Web Site
 https://web.archive.org/web/20110719123704/http://www.folkehojskoler.dk/the-danish-folk-high-school
 Report on The Hindu
 

People from Thiruvananthapuram district
1928 births
2014 deaths
Malayali people
Indian environmentalists
Indian social reformers
Recipients of the Padma Shri in social work
Social workers
20th-century Indian educators
Social workers from Kerala
20th-century Indian philanthropists